Tahj Eaddy (born July 5, 1996) is an American professional basketball player for Lavrio of the Greek Basket League. He played college basketball for the Southeast Missouri State Redhawks, the Santa Clara Broncos, and the USC Trojans.

High school career
Eaddy played basketball at Notre Dame High School in West Haven, Connecticut for three years. He moved to Tennessee Preparatory Academy in Memphis, Tennessee for his senior year. Eaddy averaged 24.6 points and was named MVP of the National Association of Christian Athletes Elite Division. He attended The Skill Factory in Atlanta, Georgia for a prep year. He committed to playing college basketball for Southeast Missouri State.

College career
As a freshman at Southeast Missouri State, Eaddy averaged 7.5 points and shot a team-high 42 percent from three-point range. For his sophomore season, he transferred to Santa Clara. After sitting out for one year due to NCAA transfer rules, Eaddy averaged 15 points and 3.2 assists per game, earning Second Team All-West Coast Conference honors. He scored a season-high 30 points in a 68–56 win over San Diego on January 3, 2019. During his junior season, Eaddy received less playing time and averaged 9.1 points. He transferred to USC for his senior season as a graduate transfer. On February 13, 2021, Eaddy scored 29 points in a 76–65 win over Washington State. As a senior, Eaddy averaged 13.6 points, 2.9 rebounds and 2.8 assists per game. He was named to the Second Team All-Pac-12. Following the season, he declared for the 2021 NBA draft instead of taking advantage of the NCAA's offer of an additional year of eligibility.

Professional career
After going undrafted in the 2021 NBA draft, Eaddy signed with the Orlando Magic for the Summer League in Las Vegas.

Eaddy was drafted with the first pick in the second round by the Raptors 905 in the 2021 NBA G League draft. However he did not make the final roster. 

On December 17, 2021, Eaddy signed with BC Prienai of the Lithuanian Basketball League. In 17 games, he averaged 9.2 points, 1.5 rebounds and 1.8 assists per contest, shooting with 44% from beyond the 3-point arc.

Eaddy started the 2022-2023 season with the Slovakian club Lučenec. In 21 games, he averaged 18.1 points, 2.2 rebounds and 3.6 assists per contest, shooting with 45% from beyond the 3-point arc.

On March 17, 2023, Eaddy moved to Greek club Lavrio for the rest of the season.

Career statistics

College

|-
| style="text-align:left;"| 2016–17
| style="text-align:left;"| Southeast Missouri State
| 30 || 12 || 22.2 || .372 || .424 || .925 || 2.3 || 2.3 || .8 || .0 || 7.5
|-
| style="text-align:left;"| 2017–18
| style="text-align:left;"| Santa Clara
| style="text-align:center;" colspan="11"|  Redshirt
|-
| style="text-align:left;"| 2018–19
| style="text-align:left;"| Santa Clara
| 31 || 31 || 35.5 || .401 || .379 || .802 || 2.7 || 3.2 || .9 || .0 || 15.0
|-
| style="text-align:left;"| 2019–20
| style="text-align:left;"| Santa Clara
| 33 || 14 || 25.2 || .407 || .333 || .830 || 2.1 || 2.1 || .9 || .0 || 9.1
|-
| style="text-align:left;"| 2020–21
| style="text-align:left;"| USC
| 33 || 32 || 32.3 || .448 || .388 || .776 || 2.9 || 2.8 || .6 || .0 || 13.6
|- class="sortbottom"
| style="text-align:center;" colspan="2"| Career
| 127 || 89 || 28.8 || .412 || .378 || .818 || 2.5 || 2.6 || .8 || .0 || 11.3

Personal life
Eaddy is the son of Tanisha Younger-Eaddy and Emery Eaddy. His father played college basketball at Norfolk State.

References

External links
USC Trojans bio
Santa Clara Broncos bio
Southeast Missouri State Redhawks bio

 

1996 births
Living people
American men's basketball players
American expatriate basketball people in Greece
American expatriate basketball people in Lithuania
American expatriate basketball people in Slovakia
Basketball players from Connecticut
BC Prienai players
BKM Lučenec players
Lavrio B.C. players
People from West Haven, Connecticut
Point guards
Santa Clara Broncos men's basketball players
Shooting guards
Southeast Missouri State Redhawks men's basketball players
USC Trojans men's basketball players